Uniontown High School is the public high school located in Uniontown, Kansas, United States at 601 E. 5th Street. It is operated by Uniontown USD 235 public school district. The school mascot is an eagle, and the school colors are black and orange.

History
The Uniontown High School marching band was selected to perform in President Ronald Reagan's Inaugural Parade on January 21, 1985.

See also
 List of high schools in Kansas
 List of unified school districts in Kansas

References

External links
 USD 235 - school district

Public high schools in Kansas